Steel Trapp: The Challenge is a young adult thriller novel written by Ridley Pearson, published in 2008 in the US by Disney Editions and distributed to Canada. It is also published in the UK by Quercus (publisher) under the shortened title Steel Trapp. The next book in the series is Steel Trapp: The Academy, was published in September 2010.

Plot summary
Steven "Steel" Trapp is travelling across the country to compete in a science challenge in Washington D.C., but when a mysterious woman gets off the train and leaves her suitcase, the adventure begins. Chasing the woman and piecing together the mystery in the suitcase, Steel discovers the unimaginable.

A human life is at stake. The FBI are on his heels. An international terrorist is coming to get him. And the lottery is going to be foiled. With the aid of his geeky friend, Kaileigh, Steel has to save the country, and his own skin, before it's too late.

References

External links
Audiofile review
New York Post review
Publishers Weekly
School Library Journal
VOYA review

2008 American novels
American young adult novels
American thriller novels